Chachkhiani is a Georgian surname. Notable people with the surname include:

Mariam Chachkhiani (born 1995), Georgian singer
Vajiko Chachkhiani (born 1985), Georgian artist

Georgian-language surnames